Spondylis is a genus of beetles belonging to the family Cerambycidae.

The species of this genus are found in Europe and Japan.

Species:
 Spondylis buprestoides (Linnaeus, 1758) 
 Spondylis tertiarius Germar, 1849

References

Cerambycidae
Cerambycidae genera